Doty is a town in Oconto County, Wisconsin, United States. The population was 249 at the 2000 census. The town was named for James Duane Doty, the first person to represent Wisconsin's third congressional district after statehood and Governor of the Utah Territory during the American Civil War.

Geography
According to the United States Census Bureau, the town has a total area of 54.4 square miles (140.9 km2), of which, 52.2 square miles (135.1 km2) of it is land and 2.2 square miles (5.8 km2) of it (4.10%) is water.

Demographics
As of the census of 2000, there were 249 people, 120 households, and 87 families residing in the town.  The population density was 4.8 people per square mile (1.8/km2).  There were 438 housing units at an average density of 8.4 per square mile (3.2/km2).  The racial makeup of the town was 98.80% White, 0.80% Asian, and 0.40% from two or more races. Hispanic or Latino of any race were 2.01% of the population.

There were 120 households, out of which 15.8% had children under the age of 18 living with them, 67.5% were married couples living together, 1.7% had a female householder with no husband present, and 27.5% were non-families. 23.3% of all households were made up of individuals, and 12.5% had someone living alone who was 65 years of age or older.  The average household size was 2.08 and the average family size was 2.38.

In the town, the population was spread out, with 11.6% under the age of 18, 2.0% from 18 to 24, 17.3% from 25 to 44, 43.4% from 45 to 64, and 25.7% who were 65 years of age or older.  The median age was 53 years. For every 100 females, there were 111.0 males.  For every 100 females age 18 and over, there were 101.8 males.

The median income for a household in the town was $32,188, and the median income for a family was $34,107. Males had a median income of $32,500 versus $28,958 for females. The per capita income for the town was $19,809.  About 9.7% of families and 14.5% of the population were below the poverty line, including 37.5% of those under the age of eighteen and 3.3% of those 65 or over.

References

Towns in Oconto County, Wisconsin
Green Bay metropolitan area
Towns in Wisconsin